Ella M. Hattan (born 1859), also known as La Jaguarina, was an American fencer and actress.

Early life 
Ella Hattan was born in Zanesville, Ohio as the tenth child of Maria C. Hinman (1824–1900) and the tailor William Hattan. (1818–1863). In 1860, the family lived in Meigs Township, Ohio. When Ella was 3 or 4, her father died in the Civil War. In 1875, her mother moved with Ella and her brother Perry to Cleveland. Ella joined a theatre company and in 1880 became a professional actress in New York. She performed with Laurence Barrett, Edwin Booth and Dion Boucicault, and other familiar actors of the time.

Fencing career 
In 1884, Ella Hattan became known as her stage name "La Jaguarina", "Champion Amazon of the World", and "Ideal Amazon of the Age", From 1884 to 1900, Hattan had established herself as skillful with the sword and the broadsword on horseback was an audience favorite.

On July 4, 1886, Hattan defeated Captain J. H. Marshall but he defeated her in the second round. Hattan met, and typically defeated, a string of male opponents which brought her to fame and popularity. On February 9, 1887, Hattan's biggest victory was against Sergeant Owen Davis of the U.S. Cavalry and was covered heavily by the San Francisco papers.

Later life 
After going through the string of male opponents willing to fight her, her manager, Fredrich Engelhardt, brought her a vaudeville tour throughout California. She would educate the crowd on fencing bouts and perform semi-nude tableaux vivante posing. Soon after the tour ended, Hattan moved back out east and had a minor acting career and a failed marriage. Ella starred in the Broadway musical The Vanderbilt Cap, which was the first time in twenty-three years where she had her real name used in print. Newspapers and print quickly connected that Hattan was as well La Jaguarina and gained publicity. Most of the publicity was asking about her fencing career and if she was planning on coming out of retirement.

The last trace of Ella Hattan in newsprint was from the Toledo Blade, in Ohio, on December 27, 1907. She was in a tour for the play called Lottie, the Poor Saleslady, or, Death Before Dishonor. In 1909, Ella Hattan disappeared without a trace so the date of her death is unknown.

References

External links
 

1859 births
Year of death missing
19th-century American actresses
American stage actresses
19th-century sportswomen
American fencers
Sportspeople from Zanesville, Ohio